Voices of Terror: Manifestos, Writings and Manuals of Al Qaeda, Hamas, and Other Terrorists from Around the World and Throughout the Ages is a book edited by scholar and historian Walter Laqueur.

The book is a comprehensive anthology of 82 primary source documents examining the morality, psychology, and ethics of ideological violence. Each document is presented with a brief introduction and short explanatory text. This book is designed as a reference for the more serious students of history and the use of terror. 

The book documents the emotions, principles, and rhetoric used by those who espouse violence whether for tyranny, revolution, guerrilla warfare, and terrorism. Primary source documents are presented from figures such as Clausewitz, Lenin, Karl Marx, Emma Goldman, Mao Zedong, Che Guevara, and Menachem Begin,  as well as English Puritan Edward Sexby and Greek satirist Lucian of Samosata. 

The book includes 26 documents of contemporary Islamic terrorist leaders and groups such as Osama bin Laden, al-Qaeda and Hamas.

References

External references
Taking Terrorists at Their Word review of Voices of Terror

Books about Islamism
Books about terrorism